Frequency analysis may refer to:

 Frequency analysis (cryptanalysis)
 A method to find the frequency spectrum of a function, wave, or signal, particularly Fourier analysis and other spectral density estimation methods
 A method to arrive at frequency distributions of phenomena, as in cumulative frequency analysis